Cherry Creek Dam (National ID # CO01280) is a dam in Arapahoe County, Colorado southeast of Denver.

It impounds Cherry Creek, a tributary of the South Platte River, for flood control. The dam and reservoir are owned and operated by the Corps of Engineers.

Recreation at the reservoir centers on the facilities of the adjacent Cherry Creek State Park, which offers camping, radio-controlled aircraft, picnicking, opportunities for bird watching, cross country skiing, fishing, horseback riding and an outdoor shooting range.

References 

Dams in Colorado
Reservoirs in Colorado
United States Army Corps of Engineers dams
Dams completed in 1950
Buildings and structures in Arapahoe County, Colorado
Bodies of water of Arapahoe County, Colorado